Inzombia (stylized as InZombia) is the tenth mixtape by Palestinian-Canadian hip hop recording artist Belly. It was released on November 11, 2016 by Roc Nation and XO. Record production on the mixtape was handled by Belly alongside a variety of producers such as Infamous, Ben Billions, DaHeala, Velous, Danny Boy Styles and more. The mixtape features guest appearances from Jadakiss, Future, Nav, Young Thug, Zack, Ty Dolla Sign and Ashanti.

Background

In an interview with Billboard, Belly said: "Inzombia is a collection of moments from the darkest place I've ever known."
This is his second project release for 2016, following Another Day in Paradise.

Promotional singles 

The album has no official singles, but two promotional singles were both released two days before the release of the mixtape, on November 9, 2016. The first promotional single is "Consuela", featuring American rappers Young Thug and Zack. The second promotional single is "The Day I Met You". The music video for the former song was released March 23, 2017.

Track listing

Charts

References

2016 mixtape albums
Belly (rapper) albums
Albums produced by Nav (rapper)